Turkey Hill may refer to:

 Turkey Hill (Linthicum Heights, Maryland), listed on the NRHP in Anne Arundel County, Maryland
 Turkey Hill (Pennsylvania), a hill in Columbia County
 Turkey Hill (company), an American food company specializing in dairy products
 Turkey Hill Minit Markets, an American chain of convenience stores owned by EG Group
 Turkey Hill Sugarbush, a Canadian maple syrup producer